Mr. Perrin and Mr. Traill is a 1948 British drama film directed by Lawrence Huntington and starring Marius Goring, David Farrar, Greta Gynt, Edward Chapman and Raymond Huntley. It is based on the 1911 novel of the same title by Hugh Walpole. Walpole based the novel on his experiences as a teacher at Epsom College, but shifted the school's setting to the Cornish coast.

Plot
The comfortable but lonely world of a middle-aged schoolmaster, "Pompo" Perrin, is upset when a new colleague arrives and proves popular with the boys, if impatient with petty school norms. The school, part of an isolated cliffside community in Cornwall, is a minor private one run by a headmaster who is somewhat sadistic and threatening towards his staff. Perrin's frustration deepens as Traill, the younger man, who has seen action in the war and is more worldly and confident, begins a relationship with an attractive school nurse, with whom Perrin has for some time been enamoured. Perrin feels himself increasingly undermined and humiliated at work, and losing his connection to his pupils. He slides into resentment and depression. He develops fantasies of violence against his perceived enemy, leading to a tragic conclusion.

Cast
 Marius Goring as Vincent Perrin 
 David Farrar as David Traill  
 Greta Gynt as Isobel Lester  
 Raymond Huntley as Moy-Thompson  
 Edward Chapman as Birkland  
 Mary Jerrold as Mrs. Perrin  
 Ralph Truman as Comber  
 Finlay Currie as Sir Joshua Varley  
 Maurice Jones as Clinton  
 Lloyd Pearson as Dormer  
 May MacDonald as Mrs. Dormer  
 Viola Lyel as Mrs. Comber
 Pat Nye as Matron

References

External links

1948 films
1948 drama films
British black-and-white films
British drama films
Films about educators
Films based on British novels
Films directed by Lawrence Huntington
Films set in Cornwall
Two Cities Films films
1940s English-language films
1940s British films